Borisovo is a village in the municipality of Novo Selo, North Macedonia.

Demographics
According to the 2002 census, the village had a total of 409 inhabitants. Ethnic groups in the village include:

Macedonians 408
Serbs 1

References

Villages in Novo Selo Municipality